Grit, Guts and Gumption: Driving Change in a State-Owned Giant is a book by Rajesh Chakrabarti, professor of Finance at Indian School of Business, Hyderabad. The book was published in November 2010 by Viking Press. The foreword of the book was written by Rajat Gupta, former managing director of McKinsey & Company and co-founder of Indian School of Business.

Description
The book documents the story of transformation of State Bank of India from 2006 to 2010 under the chairmanship of O. P. Bhatt. The book outlines the changes that took place in the human resource, technology and processes of the company.

See also
 Public sector banks in India
 Banking in India

References

External links
 Overview of Grit, Guts and Gumption in Insight, magazine of Indian School of Business

Books about companies
Business books
Finance books
2010 non-fiction books
State Bank of India
Viking Press books